Olsen Tzuan Murrain (born 24 April 1982) is a Montserratian born English cricketer.  Murrain is a right-handed batsman who bowls right-arm medium pace.  He was born on the Caribbean island of Montserrat.

Murrain represented the Leicestershire Cricket Board in 2 List A matches against the Northamptonshire Cricket Board and Kent Cricket Board in the 1st and 2nd rounds of the 2002 Cheltenham & Gloucester Trophy which were held in 2001.

References

External links
Olsen Murrain at Cricinfo
Olsen Murrain at CricketArchive

1982 births
Living people
British people of Montserratian descent
English cricketers
Leicestershire Cricket Board cricketers